The term Acta Caesaris (Acts of Caesar) is used to describe the published and unpublished legal acts passed or planned by Julius Caesar in his position as Roman dictator prior to his assassination. Notably, the Acta Caesaris included:

Certain acts passed and already enforced, such as the conferment of numerous offices to members of the populares and the optimates. For example, Mark Anthony was appointed co-consul of Caesar. By an agreement between the liberatores and Mark Anthony, all of Caesar's appointments were preserved.
A number of acts passed but yet to be enforced, such as the distribution of provinces for the following years. Decimus Brutus, for example, was awarded the province of Cisalpine Gaul. This was contested by Mark Anthony and led to the war of Mutina in 43 BC.
The completion of Caesar's reforms and unpublished acts. For example, the second triumvirate legally merged Cisalpine Gaul into Italy in 42 BC as planned by Julius Caesar (and in part already realized with the extension of Roman citizenship to that region in 49 BC). Octavian presented himself to the masses as the continuator of Caesar's programs.

For a number of years after the death of Caesar, the legal value of the acta caesaris was contested. Many argued that, if Caesar was a tyrant, all of his acts were to be abolished.

See also
Assassination of Julius Caesar

References

Julius Caesar
Roman Empire